The 1908 United States presidential election in Kentucky took place on November 3, 1908. All contemporary 46 states were part of the 1908 United States presidential election. Kentucky voters chose 13 electors to the Electoral College, which selected the president and vice president.

Kentucky was won by the Democratic nominees, former Representative William Jennings Bryan of Nebraska and his running mate John W. Kern of Indiana. Although the overall result was very similar to the previous two elections, Taft was notably the only Republican to carry Breathitt County until John McCain did so 100 years later.

Results

Results by county

Notes

References

Kentucky
1908
1908 Kentucky elections